The Montreal Convention is a multilateral treaty for the unification of certain rules for international carriage by air.

Montreal Convention may also refer to:

 Convention for the Suppression of Unlawful Acts against the Safety of Civil Aviation, 1971
 Montreal Protocol, an 1987 environmental protocol designed to protect the ozone layer
 Montreal Protocol for the Suppression of Unlawful Acts of Violence at Airports serving International Civil Aviation, 1988
 The Montreal Declaration of Anglican Essentials Canada, 1994
 Declaration of Montreal, a 2006 statement on Lesbian, Gay, Bisexual, and Transgender Human Rights

See also
Great Peace of Montreal